Yoselyn Abigail López Martínez (born 16 March 2001) is a Salvadoran footballer who plays as a forward for Sonsonate FC and El Salvador women's national team.

Club career
López has played for CD FAS and Sonsonate in El Salvador. She scored 5 goals for the former during the 2019 Apertura.

International career
López capped for El Salvador at senior level during the 2020 CONCACAF Women's Olympic Qualifying Championship qualification.

See also
List of El Salvador women's international footballers

References

2001 births
Living people
Salvadoran women's footballers
Women's association football forwards
El Salvador women's international footballers